The 2000–01 FAW Premier Cup was the fourth season of the tournament since its founding in 1997. It was won by Wrexham, their third win in four seasons.

Group stage

Group A

Group B

Group C

Quarter finals

Semi-finals

Final

References

General

2000-01
2000–01 in Welsh football cups